Jitin Prasada (born 29 November 1973) is an Indian politician from Uttar Pradesh. He was appointed Cabinet Minister by the Government of Uttar Pradesh on 26 September 2021. Earlier, he has been the former Minister of State for Human Resource Department, Government of India. He was representing Dhaurahra (Lok Sabha constituency) of district Lakhimpur Kheri, Uttar Pradesh in 15th Lok Sabha, where he won by  votes. On 9 June 2021 Jitin Prasad quit the Indian National Congress and joined the Bharatiya Janata Party in the presence of senior BJP leader Piyush Goyal.

Prasada attended The Doon School, Dehradun at roughly the same time as politicians Jyotiraditya Scindia, Kalikesh Narayan Singh Deo and Dushyant Singh and Sherwood College.

Early life
Prasada was born in Shahjahanpur, Uttar Pradesh to politician Jitendra Prasada and his wife Kanta Prasada. He attended the all-boys' boarding school, The Doon School in Dehradun (where he was a contemporary of politicians Jyotiraditya Scindia and Kalikesh Narayan Singh Deo). He did a degree in commerce from the Shri Ram College of Commerce, Delhi University and then completed his MBA from International Management Institute, New Delhi.

His grandfather Jyoti Prasad was a Congress party member and served legislative and local body positions. His grandmother Pamela Prasada belonged to the Sikh family of Kapurthala. His great grandfather Jwala Prasada was a Colonial Civil Service officer and great grandmother Purnima Devi, youngest daughter of Hemendranath Tagore brother of Nobel Laureate Rabindranath Tagore.

Political career
In 2001, Jitin Prasad started his career with Indian Youth Congress as a general secretary. In 2004, he won his first election and was elected Member of the Parliament in the 14th Lok Sabha from his hometown constituency of Shahjahanpur, U.P.

In his first tenure as Member of the Parliament Jitin Prasad was inducted as Minister of State for Steel and was one of the youngest ministers in the Cabinet (April 2008). In 2009, he fought and won the election from Dhaurara, as his home bastion Shahjahanpur came under the delimitation process.

His promise of getting the Meter gauge railway track of the district Lakhimpur Kheri converted to Broad gauge gathered major support for his candidature during 2009 Parliamentary elections. He has laid down foundation stone of a Steel factory in his constituency Dhaurahra (Lok Sabha constituency) during his tenure as Union minister of state for Steel in 2008. For the 14th Lok Sabha, Jitin held the positions of Committee on Petitions (Member); Committee on Information Technology and Communications (Member); Consultative Committee, Ministry of Civil Aviation and the Ministry of Steel.

He was appointed In-Charge for West Bengal for Congress, ahead of 2021.

Prasad joined the Bharatiya Janata Party on June 9, 2021.

References

External links
 Official biography of Shri Jitin Prasad
 biography from Govt. of India records
 Jitin Prasad: Petroleum & Natural Gas
 Gods the most misused name

India MPs 2009–2014
India MPs 2004–2009
Lok Sabha members from Uttar Pradesh
United Progressive Alliance candidates in the 2014 Indian general election
The Doon School alumni
People from Lakhimpur Kheri
People from Shahjahanpur
1973 births
Living people
Bharatiya Janata Party politicians from Uttar Pradesh
Members of the Uttar Pradesh Legislative Council